Cimanggis–Cibitung Toll Road  is a 25.39 kilometers long toll road which extends from Cimanggis to Cibitung in West Java, Indonesia. This is one of the toll roads which are part of the Jakarta Outer Ring Road 2. The toll road is expected to be able to break traffic density of two other toll roads of Greater Jakarta area, namely the Jakarta-Cikampek Toll Road and Jagorawi Toll Road.

Sections
The toll road has 4 sections:
Section 1 & 2 (Junction Cimanggis – Trans Yogie IC – Narogong IC), 8,75 Km.
Section 3 & 4 (Narogong IC – Setu – Cibitung Junction). 
Construction of this toll road was stalled since 2006, then started again in 2016. Section 1 of the toll road, which extends from Cimanggis to Transyogi has been operating since 2020, whereas the total toll road is expected to be operational by 2022.

Exits

See also

Trans-Java toll road

References

Toll roads in Indonesia
Transport in West Java